Feliciano Rossano (born 20 October 1924) was a Uruguayan boxer. He competed in the men's welterweight event at the 1948 Summer Olympics. At the 1948 Summer Olympics, he lost to Duggie Du Preez of South Africa.

References

External links
 

1924 births
Possibly living people
Uruguayan male boxers
Olympic boxers of Uruguay
Boxers at the 1948 Summer Olympics
People from Durazno
Welterweight boxers